Qalculate! is an arbitrary precision cross-platform software calculator. It supports complex mathematical operations and concepts such as derivation, integration, data plotting, and unit conversion.

Features 
Qalculate! supports common mathematical functions and operations, multiple bases, autocompletion, complex numbers, infinite numbers, arrays and matrices, variables, mathematical and physical constants, user-defined functions, symbolic derivation and integration, solving of equations involving unknowns, uncertainty propagation using interval arithmetic, plotting using Gnuplot, unit and currency conversion and dimensional analysis, and provides a periodic table of elements, as well as several functions for computer science, such as character encoding and bitwise operations.

It provides four interfaces: Two GUIs, one using GTK (qalculate-gtk) and another using Qt (qalculate-qt), a library for use in other programs (libqalculate), and a CLI program for use in a terminal (qalc).

 Qalculate! (GTK+ GUI): qalculate-gtk 
 Qalculate! (Qt GUI): qalculate-qt 
 Qalculate! (CLI): qalc (usually provided by the libqalculate package)
 Qalculate! (Library): libqalculate

Use in academic research 
 Bartel, Alexandre. "DOS Software Security: Is there Anyone Left to Patch a 25-year old Vulnerability?." 
 "In our example of Figure 7, we choose to execute /usr/bin/qalculate-gtk, a calculator. Since the stack of the DOSBox process is non-executable, we cannot directly inject our shellcode on it."
 "The Gnome calculator was used to perform these calculations and the results were verified using the Qalculate! calculator and WolframAlpha (15) since spreadsheets are unable to perform these calculations."

See also
 Mathematical software
 List of arbitrary-precision arithmetic software
 Comparison of software calculators

References

External links 
 Qalculate! - the ultimate desktop calculator at GitHub
 Qalculate! - downloads at GitHub
 Qalculate/qalculate-gtk GUI at GitHub
 Qalculate! Manual at GitHub
 QALC man page at GitHub
 Ubuntu – Details of package qalculate in bionic
 Ubuntu – Details of package qalculate in focal
 Qalculate! code review by PVS-Studio

Free educational software
GNOME Applications
Software calculators